Al Mushayrifah may refer to:
Al Mushayrifah (31°54'2"N 36°'3'10"E), Jordan
Al Mushayrifah (31°30'0"N 35°52'0"E), Jordan